Holland with Boston by-election may apply to one of three by-elections held for the British House of Commons constituency of Holland with Boston, in Lincolnshire.

 1924 Holland with Boston by-election
 1929 Holland with Boston by-election
 1937 Holland with Boston by-election

See also
Holland with Boston (UK Parliament constituency)